Gumly Gumly is a suburb of the city of Wagga Wagga, New South Wales, Australia and is located approximately 8 km east of the CBD on the Sturt Highway.

See also 
 List of reduplicated Australian place names

References

External links 

Suburbs of Wagga Wagga